Oliver Benjamin Gavin (born 29 September 1972), is a British racing driver who joined Corvette Racing in 2002. He has won five American Le Mans Series class championships, five 24 Hours of Le Mans class wins, five 12 Hours of Sebring class wins and five Petit Le Mans class wins.

Biography
He was raised in the village of Felmersham, Bedfordshire. He attended the local Primary school, Pinchmill. At age nine he attended Lincroft Middle School and then took his GCSEs and A-levels at Sharnbrook Upper School and Community College.

Born in Huntingdon, Gavin was introduced to motor racing through the traditional karting route. After finishing as runner-up in the 1993 British F3 series to Kelvin Burt, Gavin graduated to Formula 3000 in 1994 with Omegaland. He failed to score any points in the five races he contested, and subsequently opted to drop back down to F3 for 1995. He managed to overcome rival Ralph Firman in the final round to snatch the title.

He was test driver for the ill-fated mid-1990s Pacific Grand Prix team. It was proposed that he would drive for the team in the 1995 Australian Grand Prix, but he was not granted the required FIA Super Licence. Gavin also drove the Safety Car from 1997 to 1999 for the Formula One championship.

Gavin became a Corvette Racing factory driver in 2002, having raced full-time in the American Le Mans Series GT1 and GT2 classes and currently the IMSA SportsCar Championship GTLM class. His full-time codrivers have been Olivier Beretta (2004-2010), Jan Magnussen (2010-2011) and Tommy Milner (since 2012), whereas Max Papis, Richard Westbrook and Jordan Taylor have been his endurance codrivers.

He has won his class in Le Mans on five occasions (2002, 2004, 2005, 2006 and 2015), the 12 Hours of Sebring five times (2001, 2002, 2006, 2007 and 2013), and Petit Le Mans another five times (2002, 2004, 2005, 2007 and 2010). Also, he won the ALMS GT1 titles in 2005, 2006 and 2007, plus the GT2 title in 2012.

Gavin announced his retirement from professional racing on 31 October 2020, with the 2021 WEC 6 Hours of Spa-Francorchamps being his final race. He placed 4th in the GTE Pro class with co-driver, Antonio Garcia, and 18th overall.

Gavin lives in a village east of  Northampton with his wife, Helen, and their three children. He announced on April 29, 2021 via Twitter that he will be continuing his working relationship with Chevrolet with the formation of a new racing school, the Oliver Gavin Driving Academy, featuring Corvette C8 Stingrays as the primary instructional vehicle.

Racing record

Complete International Formula 3000 results
(key) (Races in bold indicate pole position) (Races in italics indicate fastest lap)

Complete International Touring Car Championship results
(key) (Races in bold indicate pole position) (Races in italics indicate fastest lap)

† — Retired, but was classified as he completed 90% of the winner's race distance.

24 Hours of Le Mans results

Complete GT1 World Championship results

Complete WeatherTech SportsCar Championship results
(key) (Races in bold indicate pole position) (Races in italics indicate fastest lap)

Bathurst 1000 results

References

External links
Official Website

1972 births
Living people
English racing drivers
British Formula Three Championship drivers
People from Huntingdon
International Formula 3000 drivers
24 Hours of Le Mans drivers
24 Hours of Daytona drivers
American Le Mans Series drivers
European Le Mans Series drivers
FIA GT1 World Championship drivers
Supercars Championship drivers
Rolex Sports Car Series drivers
People educated at Sharnbrook Academy
FIA World Endurance Championship drivers
ADAC GT Masters drivers
WeatherTech SportsCar Championship drivers
24 Hours of Spa drivers
People from Felmersham
Corvette Racing drivers
Team Joest drivers
Nordic Racing drivers
Aston Martin Racing drivers
Kelly Racing drivers
TOM'S drivers